Joanne Duffy is a Paralympic medalist from New Zealand who competed in alpine skiing.  She competed in the 1994 Winter Paralympics where she won a gold medal in downhill and a bronze in Super-G.

References

External links 
 
 

Alpine skiers at the 1994 Winter Paralympics
Paralympic bronze medalists for New Zealand
Paralympic gold medalists for New Zealand
Living people
New Zealand female alpine skiers
Year of birth missing (living people)
Medalists at the 1994 Winter Paralympics
Paralympic medalists in alpine skiing
Paralympic alpine skiers of New Zealand
20th-century New Zealand women